Whitelees is an area of in the north-east of Cumbernauld, North Lanarkshire, Scotland. It is about a two and a quarter miles from Cumbernauld Town Centre. It lies between Abronhill and Wardpark South.

In the history of the new town it was a distinct area from Abronhill. However in common with Ravenswood near Seafar the name of the larger, more signed area has tended to be used far more often. The line of demarcation is at the Whitelees Roundabout, south of which, Abronhill's roads take the names of trees.  Houses in Whitelees tend to be in private hands making Whitelees blue on the SIMD map of Scotland. Whitelees is skirted by the Walton Burn whereas Abronhill is not although historically there was a North Whitelees and South Whitelees, the latter being in what is now thought of as Abronhill. Other old maps show Whitelees with various spellings including maps by Charles Ross and William Roy.

The area is probably best known for Whitelees Primary School which is a feeder school for Cumbernauld Academy.

Toponymy
The etymology of the name is uncertain but may mean "a clearing in a wood".

References

Populated places in North Lanarkshire
Areas of Cumbernauld